Walrus Island is an uninhabited island within the Arctic Archipelago in the Kitikmeot Region, Nunavut. It is located in Kiluhiqtuq, formerly Bathurst Inlet. Other islands in the vicinity include Ekalulia Island, Lewes Island, Patsy Klengenberg Island, Galena Island, Iglorua Island, Marcet Island, and Fishers Island.

References 

Islands of Bathurst Inlet
Uninhabited islands of Kitikmeot Region